Riefkohl is the surname of the following people:
Johann Ernst Christian Riefkohl (1783–1855), Pastor at the Lutheran church in Langendorf, Germany
Frederick Lois Riefkohl (1889–1969), Puerto Rican officer in the United States Navy 
Rafael Bernabe Riefkohl (born 1959), Puerto Rican politician
Rudolph W. Riefkohl (1885–1950), Puerto Rican officer in the United States Army, brother of Frederick
William Riefkohl (born 1939), Executive Director of the Puerto Rico Manufacturers Association